Prosenella muehni is a species of beetle in the family Cerambycidae. It was described by Bruch in 1933. It is known from Argentina.

References

Apomecynini
Beetles described in 1933